Bobby Allen Howard (born June 1, 1964) is a former American football running back. He played for the Tampa Bay Buccaneers in 1986-1988.

References

1964 births
Living people
American football running backs
Indiana Hoosiers football players
Tampa Bay Buccaneers players